MPEC may refer to:
 Mathematical programming with equilibrium constraints
 Minor Planet Electronic Circular
 Multi-Purpose Experiment Canister (MPEC (US satellite)), a classified aditya launched by Space Shuttle mission STS-39 in April 1991
multi-purpose event center, or more particularly the Wichita Falls Multi-Purpose Event Center